Starfinger is a DC Comics supervillain appearing in media published by DC Comics, primarily as an enemy of the Legion of Super-Heroes. He  first appeared in Adventure Comics #335 (August 1965), and was created by Edmond Hamilton and John Forte.

Fictional character biography

Lars Hanscom
Starfinger was a helmeted figure with five different powers generated by each finger of his right hand. The Legion discovers that Starfinger is actually Lightning Lad, controlled by Dr. Lars Hanscom. Hanscom, under the guise of examining Lightning Lad's robotic arm, had hypnotized the Legionnaire and outfitted him with the Starfinger glove, so that Hanscom could obtain the rare metal rejuvium by threatening to destroy the "Seven Wonders of the 30th Century". Hanscom was brought to justice, but later escaped prison and attempted a solo criminal career. His most notorious crime was kidnapping one of Duo Damsel's bodies during her wedding to Bouncing Boy. He later tried as "Doctor Larsh" (Lars H.) to use Lightning Lad again on the eve of the birth of the Legionnaire's twins, but was easily defeated.

Char Burrane
Young Science Police cadet Gim Allon was on Mars chasing a fugitive just moments prior to the meteor strike that would imbue him with the growth powers he would use to become a Legionnaire. That criminal, Char Burrane would later escape again, and while fleeing across the Martian surface, would stumble upon a mysterious ring which was capable of generating two super-powered women, identifying themselves as Starlight and Starbright who originated from a micro world contained within the ring itself. With their powers, Burrane then begins building a criminal empire. Years later, he claims the name of Starfinger and has Hanscom killed on Takron-Galtos II to announce his arrival. Displaying an obvious vendetta against Colossal Boy, the new Starfinger battles the Legion and ultimately captures his personal nemesis and an undercover Chameleon Boy (acting on his own as Legion Espionage Leader). Overwhelmed by the subsequent team of rescuing Legionnaires, Starfinger flees to the secret world within his ring. Shrinking Violet discovers the ring, which is then heavily guarded.

Molock Hanscom
In the fourth volume of the Legion of Super-Heroes series, Molock Hanscom (formerly the leader of the Cosmic Spy League and brother of Lars) takes on the Starfinger role by arranging the assassination of Burrane. He sends killers (including the Persuader) after Char Burrane II to capture his predecessor's ring, and ultimately becomes successful in acquiring the artifact. Starfinger III is killed by the Khunds.

Powers and abilities 
Starfinger's right hand has five star tipped fingers, each of which can project different energy rays. Each ray has a different property: 
 Thumb – Neutralizing ray
 Index finger – Lightning
 Middle finger – Super-thrust ray
 Ring finger – Can project any kind of radiation (e.g. heat, green kryptonite, gamma rays, shrinking rays, etc.) 
 Pinky – Freezing ray

Using all the fingers together projects a distorting ray that scrambles superpowers and makes them function erratically.

In other media
 The Char Burrane version of Starfinger appears in the Legion of Super-Heroes episode "The Substitutes", voiced by Taylor Negron. This version is arrogant and narcissistic, and has a thick, and comically near-incomprehensible, Spanish accent. Starfinger wears a pair of mechanical gloves that have a different power in each finger. One finger has the ability to create small furry creatures which (unknown even to him) grow into monsters that eat the Earth's ionosphere. With the Legion busy trying to stop them, the Legion of Substitute Heroes are left to fight Starfinger, and ultimately succeed. He makes two additional appearances in the tie-in-comic, Legion of Super-Heroes in the 31st Century.

References 

Characters created by Edmond Hamilton
Characters created by John Forte
Comics characters introduced in 1965
DC Comics supervillains